Gudbrand Bøhn (November 10, 1839 – January 18, 1906) was a Norwegian violinist, concertmaster, and music teacher.

Bøhn was born in Nes in Akershus county, Norway. He was the son of the violinist Ole Gulbrandsen Bøhn (1803–1882).

He was a central figure in the capital city's artistic community, where he started holding regular chamber music evenings, and he was the concertmaster at the Christiania Theater until 1899, when it closed. Bøhn premiered Edvard Grieg's Violin Sonata No. 1 in F major, Op. 8 in 1867 with the composer at the piano. His students included Christian Sinding, Sigurd Lie, Michael Flagstad, Harald Heide, William Farre, and Johan Halvorsen.

Bøhn died in Kristiania (now Oslo).

References

Norwegian violinists
People from Nes, Akershus
1839 births
1906 deaths
19th-century violinists
Male violinists
19th-century Norwegian musicians
19th-century male musicians
19th-century musicians